Josip Bogoslaw Tanko (April 21, 1906 – October 5, 1993) was a Croat filmmaker who directed O Trapalhão nas Minas do Rei Salomão, one of the biggest cinematic hits in Brazil of all time.  He also founded JBTV - J. B. Tanko Filmes Ltda.



Biography
Josip Bogoslaw Tanko was born on April 21, 1906, in the Croatian city of Sisak. He was passionate about cinema from childhood.

In the 1930s, he started working at Sascha-Filmindustrie AG and Wlen-Film GmbH in Vienna, Austria creating Yugoslavian versions of German and Austrian films.  He also worked at Tobis Filmkunst, Terra Filmkunst, and UFA in Berlin as an assistant director, participating as part of a team in the 1937 Wien-Film, created by Goebbels.

At the beginning of World War II, Tanko took over the Army Documentary Film Department in Belgrade.

Tanko filmed the bombing of Belgrade when Yugoslavia was invaded by Germany, fleeing to Berlin with the film.

In 1942, Tanko returned to Vienna.; however, having lost his entire family during the war, he decided to emigrate to Brazil.

In 1948, Tanko took up residence in the city of Rio de Janeiro, contributing to the professionalization of Brazilian cinema with his diverse experience. His first work was in Cinelândia Filmes, as assistant director and screenwriter of A Escrava Isaura, an adaptation of Bernardo Guimarães' novel.

Without leaving Cinelandia, he also began to work in the Cinematographic Atlântida, where he played several roles, ultimately becoming a director. Having made some dramas that were not successful with the audience, he turned to comedies (chanchadas).

In the 1950s, J. B. Tanko worked with Watson Macedo and Roberto Farias.

In 1955, he began working for Herbert Richers. He directed 18 films for Richers, including a series of comedies starring Ankito, Grande Otelo, Zé Trindade and Ronald Golias. Tanko also continued working on dramas, police films, and movies for children.

In 1967, he directed Adoravel Trapalhão, where he met his longtime partner, Renato Aragão.  He continued his work, directing eleven episodes for the TV series Os Trapalhões.

In 1969, he founded JBTV - J. B. Tanko Filmes Ltda and directed several comedies for teenagers. Working with the team from Os Trapalhões, he directed the film,O Trapalhão nas Minas do Rei Salomão, one of the biggest box offices hits in Brazilian cinema of all time (about 6 million spectators).

Tanko has also produced films of other genres, such as the erotic drama As Borboletas Também Amam, with the actress Angelina Muniz, and the musical Vamos Cantar Disco, Baby?, with the ensemble "As Melindrosas."

In 1983, he produced the film Perdoa-Me Por Me Traíres, which was directed by the Braz Chediak and was based on the work of Nélson Rodrigues.

When Dedé Santana, Zacarias and Mussum separated from Renato Aragão, creating the DeMuZa Produções, J. B. Tanko produced the comedy Atrapalhando a Suate.

At the age of 81, he directed his last film, Os Fantasmas Trapalhões, before dying of a heart attack 6 years later, at 87. His son, Alexander Tanko, continued his father's craft until his death on July 12, 2006 at the age of 53.

Filmography

1946 - Amerika Hilft Oesterreich
1948 - A Escrava Isaura (assistant director)
1951 - Areias ardentes
1954 - A outra face do homem
1956 - Com Água na Boca
1956 - Sai de Baixo
1956 - Fuzileiro do Amor (production manager)
1957 - Com Jeito Vai
1957 - Metido a Bacana
1958 - E o Bicho Não Deu
1959 - Entrei de gaiato
1959 - Garota Enxuta
1959 - Mulheres à Vista
1960 - Marido de Mulher Boa
1960 - Vai que É Mole
1961 - O Dono da Bola
1961 - Bom mesmo é Carnaval
1964 - Asfalto Selvagem
1964 - Um Ramo para Luísa
1966 - Engraçadinha depois dos 30
1967 - Adorável Trapalhão with Renato Aragão and Os Trapalhões
1967 - Carnaval Barra
1968 - Massacre no Supermercado
1969 - Pais quadrados, filhos avançados
1970 - Como Ganhar na Loteria sem Perder a Esportiva
1971 - Rua descalça
1971 - Som, amor e curtição
1972 - Salve-se Quem Puder - Rally da Juventude
1973 - Aladim e a lâmpada maravilhosa
1974 - Robin Hood, o trapalhão da floresta with Renato Aragão and Os Trapalhões
1975 - O Trapalhão na Ilha do Tesouro with Renato Aragão and Os Trapalhões
1976 - O Trapalhão no Planalto dos Macacos with Renato Aragão and Os Trapalhões
1976 - Simbad, o marujo trapalhão with Renato Aragão and Os Trapalhões
1977 - O Trapalhão nas minas do Rei Salomão with Renato Aragão and Os Trapalhões
1978 - As Borboletas também Amam
1979 - Vamos Cantar Disco, Baby?
1980 - Atrapalhando a Suate with Renato Aragão and Os Trapalhões
1981 - Os Saltimbancos Trapalhões with Renato Aragão and Os Trapalhões
1982 - Os Trapalhões na Serra Pelada with Renato Aragão and Os Trapalhões
1982 - Os Vagabundos Trapalhões with Renato Aragão and Os Trapalhões
1983 - Perdoa-me por Me Traíres (producer)
1987 - Os Fantasmas Trapalhões with Renato Aragão and Os Trapalhões

Awards
 Areias Ardentes (feature film) - Saci Award, 1952, SP, for Best Screenplay for J. B. Tanko.
 Sai de Baixo (feature film) - Special Award for Tanko, J. B. in the Special Governor Award of the State of São Paulo, 1956, São Paulo - SP.

References

External links
 Book: Dicionário de Cineastas Brasileiros, author: Luis Felipe Miranda, publishing: Secretaria de Estado da Cultura, 1990, 408 pages (Google Books)
 Book: Cinema Televisão e Publicidade, author: José Mario Ortiz Ramos, Editora AnnaBlume (Google Books)
 Book: A Odisséia do Cinema Brasileiro, da Atlântida a Cidade de Deus, author: Laurent Desbois, publishing company: Companhia das Letras (Google Books)
 Book: Cinema Brasileiro Volume 1, author: Celso Marconi, publishing company: Edições Bagaço, 2000, 583 pages (Google Books)
 J. B. Tanko in Portal Cinemateca Brasileira
 J. B. Tanko on IMDb

1906 births
1993 deaths
Brazilian film directors
Brazilian film producers
Brazilian screenwriters
Yugoslav emigrants to Brazil
Writers from Rio de Janeiro (city)
People from Sisak
Croatian film directors
Croatian film producers
Croatian screenwriters
20th-century screenwriters